Elachista nevadensis is a moth of the family Elachistidae. It is found in Spain.

References

nevadensis
Moths described in 1978
Moths of Europe